Maltais is a surname. Notable people with the surname include:

 Agnès Maltais (1956-), Canadian politician
 André Maltais (1948-), Canadian politician
 Dominique Maltais 1980-), Canadian snowboarder
 Steve Maltais (1969-), Canadian ice hockey player
 Valérie Maltais (1990-), Canadian ice skater